Żuków Pierwszy  is a village in the administrative district of Gmina Krzczonów, within Lublin County, Lublin Voivodeship, in eastern Poland. Żuków Pierwszy uses Central European Summer Time.

References

Villages in Lublin County